The Lawson's LPGA Classic was a golf tournament on the LPGA Tour from 1974 to 1975. It was played at the Weymouth Valley Country Club in Medina, Ohio.

Winners
Lawson's LPGA Classic
1975 Carol Mann
Lawson's LPGA Open
1974 Sandra Haynie

References

External links
Weymouth Valley Country Club

Former LPGA Tour events
Golf in Ohio
Recurring sporting events established in 1974
Recurring sporting events disestablished in 1975
1974 establishments in Ohio
1975 disestablishments in Ohio
Medina, Ohio
History of women in Ohio